Michael Roberto Kenyi is a South Sudanese politician. As of 2011, he is the Minister of Agriculture and Forestry of Central Equatoria.

See also
Politics of South Sudan

References

21st-century South Sudanese politicians
Living people
Year of birth missing (living people)
Place of birth missing (living people)